No 3 Komarapalayam is a village panchayat in Vennandur block.

Geographic

No 3 Komarapalayam is a village in Vennandur Block in Namakkal District of Tamil Nadu State, India. It is located 34 km towards North from District headquarters Namakkal. 340 km from State capital Chennai.This Place is in the border of the Namakkal District and Salem District. Salem District Veerapandi is North towards this place .

Sub villages
Komarapalayam
Keeranur, Vennandur
 Annamalaipatty Kombaikadu 
 Gandhi Nagar
 Vasantham Nagar
 Karattu Valavu
 Molagoundan Valasu
 Gundu Perumal Kovil Karadu
Kasalar Kuttai

Places
Periyamariyamman kovil
Chinnamariyamman kovil
Shri Varalakshmi Company

Education
Government Middle School,
Government Higher Secondary School, Mallur.
Vitri Vikaas Boys HSS, Keeranur
Vitri Vikaas Girls HSS, Keeranur

Transport

Roadway
Only few buses are running to and fro between Vennandur and Salem old bus stand via No 3 Komarapalayam.

Senthil Bus No:33
SRN Bus No:33
TNSRTC No:53/33

Railway
Nearest railway station is Mallur railway station, 2 km from here.

References

Vennandur block